Fair Exchange is an American television sitcom series that ran from September 21, 1962 to 1963 on CBS. It starred Judy Carne and Lynn Loring.

Premise
Eddie Walker (Eddie Foy Jr.) and Tommy Finch (Victor Maddern) were World War II veterans and old friends who decided to have their teenage daughters live in each other's households for a year because Eddie's daughter Patty (Lynn Loring) wanted to study at the Royal Academy of Dramatic Arts in London.

While Patty lived in London with Tommy, his wife Sybil (Diana Chesney), and their son Neville (Dennis Waterman), Tommy's daughter Heather (Judy Carne) lived with Eddie, his wife Dorothy (Audrey Christie), and their son, also named Tommy (Flip Mark) in New York City.

The show focused on the joys and the difficulties that Heather and Patty experienced as they lived in each other's families.

Heather had troubles in trying to deal with a less formality ridden way of life in New York City and in the States, while Patty was trying to deal with the more formal and more tradition-emphasized way of life in London.

The fathers had their own share of difficulties in trying to help the daughters to adjust, while Dorothy and Sybil, while also having to adjust with different girls living in their households, were able to take it more in stride.

Fair Exchange replaced Rod Serling's The Twilight Zone on CBS's fall schedule in 1962. The series was the first hour-long sitcom since The Lucy–Desi Comedy Hour, but it was dropped. After mail protested CBS's decision, the network revived Fair Exchange in a half-hour format, but again the series failed in the ratings and was finally cancelled.

The Twilight Zone would replace Fair Exchange mid-season, albeit in an hour-long format.

Cast
Eddie Foy Jr. as Eddie Walker
Audrey Christie as Dorothy Walker
Victor Maddern as Tommy Finch
Diana Chesney as Sybil Finch
Lynn Loring as Patty Walker
Dennis Waterman as Neville Finch
Judy Carne as Heather Finch
Flip Mark as Larry Walker

Episodes

Season 1 (1962)

Season 2 (1963)

References

External links
 

1962 American television series debuts
1963 American television series endings
1960s American sitcoms
Black-and-white American television shows
CBS original programming
English-language television shows
Television series about families
Television series by CBS Studios
Television series by Desilu Productions
Works about veterans
Television shows set in London
Television shows set in New York City